Le Port-Royal (also known as Port-Royal Apartments) is an apartment building on Sherbrooke Street in the Golden Square Mile district of Montreal, Quebec, Canada. Completed in 1964, it used to be the highest residential building in Canada east of Toronto until the completion of Altitude Montreal in 2013. It was built in the modernist style, with a concrete and glass facade. Le Port-Royal is located at 1455 Sherbrooke Street West opposite Mackay Street, and next to the Church of St. Andrew and St. Paul. The building consists of luxury apartments.

See also
 List of tallest buildings in Montreal

References

Skyscrapers in Montreal
Residential buildings completed in 1964
Modernist architecture in Canada
Residential skyscrapers in Canada
Apartment buildings in Quebec
Downtown Montreal
Residential buildings in Montreal